is a near-Earth Apollo asteroid that passed  from Earth on 11 December 2013. It passed by Earth at about 2 lunar distances, and was discovered 5 days previously, on 7 December 2013.

It was described as being about the size of the Space Shuttle and was reported to be traveling at 14 kilometers per second (over 31 thousand miles per hour) relative to the Earth.

2013 XY8 was noted for being analogous to 101955 Bennu.Target Asteroids! List of Near Earth Asteroids and Asteroids Analogous to (101955) Bennu

Observations
2013 XY8 was imaged by the Faulkes Telescope South.

References

See also
 List of asteroid close approaches to Earth in 2013

External links
 N. Atkinson - "Space Shuttle-Sized Asteroid 2013 XY8 to Fly Past Earth on Dec. 11"
 Radar images of 2013 XY8
 

Minor planet object articles (unnumbered)

20131211